Damarwulan is a Javanese legendary hero who appears in a cycle of stories used in the performance of wayang klitik, as well as Langendriya (female dance-opera) and ketoprak (popular theater). These stories tell of the struggles between the Majapahit and Blambangan kingdoms, in which Damarwulan gains honor. The stories are especially popular in East Java.

Origin
The Damarwulan legend is associated with the Majapahit court at the time of the queen Suhita, at which time there was a war with Blambangan. However, the names of the characters Damar Wulan ("radiance of the moon") and Menak Jingga ("red knight") suggest that it may incorporate elements of an older sun-moon myth. It is uncertain when the story was (MSS.Jav.89) was donated to the Library in 1815. It is thought to date to the late 18th century, and "begins with the accession of the daughter of Brawijaya (Kusuma Kancana Wungu) to the throne of Majapahit."

Characters
 Prabu Kenya, also known as Queen Kencanawungu, the maiden queen regnant of Majapahit
 Patih Lohgender, her prime minister
 Layang Seta and Layang Kumitir, the prime minister's twin sons
 Dewi Anjasmara, the prime minister's daughter
 Damarwulan, the prime minister's nephew, raised away from court by his grandfather
 Menak Jingga, the King of Blambangan, a vassal of Majapahit
 Dewi Wahita and Dewi Puyengan, princesses held captive by Menak Jingga as concubines
 Sabdapalon and Nayagenggong, Damarwulan's servants

Synopsis

Damarwulan is a prince by birth, a nephew of the prime minister, Patih Lohgender, but was raised in the hermitage of his grandfather. Following his grandfather's advice, he goes to the Majapahit court seeking worldly experiences and employment. His cousins, the arrogant Layang Seta and Layang Kumitir, the prime minister's sons, mistreat him when he arrives. Patih Lohgender, not wanting him to compete with his own sons, assigns him as grass-cutter and stableboy to attends Lohgender's horses. Though he is stripped of his fine garments and works as a humble servant in stable, Damarwulan still looks strikingly handsome. The rumors of a handsome stableboy eventually reach Anjasmara, the prime minister's daughter. She seeks him out secretly and they fall in love and are clandestinely married. One night, Anjasmara's brothers overhear voices in her chamber. They break in to find Damarwulan in Anjasmara's chamber, and try to kill him, but he is able to overcome them. They flee to their father, who orders that Damarwulan be executed. Anjasmara pleas for her lover, and he doesn't execute Damarwulan, but imprisons the pair.

Meanwhile, Menak Jingga, the king of Blambangan has written a letter to the Queen Kencanawungu asking for her hand. When the queen rejects him, he declares war on the Majapahit kingdom. He is successful in dispatching Majapahit's allies, and finally the kingdom is threatened by his forces directly. In distress, the queen announces that whoever kills Menak Jingga and brings her his head can have her hand. Worried when no saviors present themselves, she has a divine revelation that a young knight named Damarwulan can overcome him. She orders Patih Lohgender to release him from jail and send him forth on his mission.

Damarwulan, accompanied by his servants, makes his way to Blambangan. Arriving at night, he sneaks into the gardens and manages to overhear a conversation at the pavilion between two resentful captive princesses, Dewi Wahita and Dewi Puyengan, that are forced to be the concubines of Menak Jingga. Damarwulan enters the pavilion and confides in them, enamoured by his charm and good looks, they fall in love and become devoted to him. At this time, Menak Jingga decides to visit the princesses, and discovers Damarwulan. They fight, but Damarwulan is unable to hurt Menak Jingga, and severely wounded, appears to die. Menak Jingga leaves, ordering his servants to guard the body. However, when they fall asleep the two princesses carry him away, nurture him, and explain to the secret of  Menak Jingga's magic invulnerability, a club of yellow iron kept behind his headrest. If the king is hit on his left temple with this club, he will die. Risking their lives for the sake of their lover, the princesses manage to steal the club while the Menak Jingga is asleep. A second battle between Menak Jingga and Damarwulan follows, in which Damarwulan manages to behead the king. Successful, he returns to Majapahit, but the prime minister's twin sons ambush him outside the palace, killing him and presenting Menak Jingga's head to the queen. However, Damarwulan was not died yet, a hermit rescues and revives Damarwulan. Finally the queen learns what happened to Damarwulan. In a final battle, Damarwulan defeats his cousins. Damarwulan is crowned as the King of Majapahit, and is permitted to retain Anjasmara as his other wife, also Dewi Wahita and Dewi Puyengan as his concubines.

Notes

References
 Claire Holt. Art in Indonesia: Continuities and Change. Ithaca: Cornell UP, 1967.

Further reading
 Yoe Djin Lim. The story of Damar-Wulan the most popular legend of Indonesia Semarang: Lim Yoe Siang. OCLC: 24973772

Javanese folklore
Indonesian fairy tales
Mythological kings